Phulwari may refer to:

 Phulwari, Iran
 Phulwari, Nepal
 Phulwari (Vidhan Sabha constituency)
 Phulwari Sharif
 Phulwari (1984 film), a Hindi film
 Phoolwari, a 1946 Indian Bollywood film